Dog Lake is a lake in Salt Lake County, Utah located between Millcreek Canyon and Big Cottonwood Canyon.  The lake can be accessed by hiking trails from either canyon.

References

Lakes of Utah
Lakes of Salt Lake County, Utah